Fernandez v. California, 571 U.S. 292 (2014), was a U.S. Supreme Court case that explored the limits of Georgia v. Randolph, a 2006 case that held that consent to search a dwelling is invalid in the presence of an objecting co-resident. Fernandez, however, held that when the objecting co-resident is removed for objectively reasonable purposes (such as lawful arrest), the remaining resident may validly consent to search.

Case aspects

Supreme Court Case law precedent
Fernandez v. California is  governed by two cases: The 1974 case United States v. Matlock and the 2005 case Georgia v. Randolph. In Matlock the U.S. Supreme Court laid out the so-called "co-occupant consent rule". This rule means that anyone who has "common authority" over the home can consent to a search of the home. The Supreme Court defined "common authority" as “mutual use of the property by persons generally having joint access or control for most purposes, so that it is reasonable to recognize that any of the co-inhabitants has the right to permit the inspection in his own right and that the others have assumed the risk that one of their number might permit the common area to be searched. Then they arrested him.” In essence the court decided that any one person who is a “joint occupant” can consent to a police search of the shared residence, without a search warrant. In Georgia v. Randolph the Court limited the holding of Matlock. In Randolph the court decided that when co-occupants who are disagreeing whether to let the police search their dwelling the police can't conduct a search, if a "physically present" co-occupant objects that search.

Case background
When police arrived at Fernandez's apartment, they believed a suspect in a gang-related assault had just entered. While approaching the apartment they heard screaming and fighting occurring inside. Police knocked on the apartment's door, which was answered by Fernandez's bloodied girlfriend. Believing that Fernandez may have assaulted his girlfriend, police attempted to separate the two. Fernandez refused to follow the police's directive to step away from his girlfriend and yelled "You don't have a right to come in here. I know my rights." The officers soon realized that Fernandez was the suspect in the gang-related assault and arrested him for that crime. About an hour later the police came back to ask Fernandez's girlfriend for consent to search the apartment, which she gave. Fernandez later challenged the lawfulness of this third-party consent.  Counsel to Fernandez were attorneys Jeff Fischer and Gerald Peters.

Supreme Court decision
By a vote of six to three, the Court ruled that the search which followed the arrest of defendant Fernandez did not violate the Constitution, because Fernandez was no longer physically there and had been removed for fair reasons. Respect for the girlfriend's independent voluntary consent requires that it be honored. The three dissenting judges argued that the girlfriend had been pressured into consenting, and that police should have gotten a search warrant once they knew Fernandez objected to the search.

References

External links
 
 SCOTUSblog Coverage of Fernandez v. California (2014)-

2013 in United States case law
United States Supreme Court cases
United States Supreme Court cases of the Roberts Court
United States Fourth Amendment case law